Karim Loukili (born 28 April 1997) is a professional footballer who plays as a midfielder for Karmiotissa. Born in the Netherlands, he represented Morocco at under-20 international level.

Club career
He made his professional debut in the Eerste Divisie for Jong FC Utrecht on 19 December 2016 in a game against SC Telstar.

Loukili joined CR Al Hoceima in August 2018 and played for the club until the end of the year, before he was released. After having been a free agent for six months, he joined the reserve team of Sparta Rotterdam, Jong Sparta, in the summer of 2019. In January 2020, Loukili moved to German fifth-tier club 1. FC Phönix Lübeck, playing in the Oberliga Schleswig-Holstein.

After six months, on 1 August 2020, Loukili joined Helmond Sport after a successful trial on a one-year deal with a one-year option.

On 17 July 2021, he moved to Riga FC in Latvia. On 27 July 2022, Loukili had his contract terminated by mutual consent.

References

External links
 
 

1997 births
Footballers from The Hague
Dutch sportspeople of Moroccan descent
Living people
Dutch footballers
Netherlands youth international footballers
Moroccan footballers
Morocco under-20 international footballers
Association football midfielders
Jong FC Utrecht players
Chabab Rif Al Hoceima players
1. FC Phönix Lübeck players
Helmond Sport players
Riga FC players
Debreceni VSC players
Karmiotissa FC players
Eerste Divisie players
Tweede Divisie players
Botola players
Oberliga (football) players
Latvian Higher League players
Cypriot First Division players
Dutch expatriate footballers
Moroccan expatriate footballers
Expatriate footballers in Germany
Dutch expatriate sportspeople in Germany
Moroccan expatriate sportspeople in Germany
Expatriate footballers in Latvia
Moroccan expatriate sportspeople in Latvia
Dutch expatriate sportspeople in Latvia
Expatriate footballers in Hungary
Moroccan expatriate sportspeople in Hungary
Dutch expatriate sportspeople in Hungary
Expatriate footballers in Cyprus
Moroccan expatriate sportspeople in Cyprus
Dutch expatriate sportspeople in Cyprus